Stara Syniava is an urban-type settlement in Khmelnytskyi Raion, Khmelnytskyi Oblast (province) in western Ukraine. It hosts the administration of Stara Syniava settlement hromada, one of the hromadas of Ukraine. The settlement's population was 5,961 as of the 2001 Ukrainian Census and 

The settlement, previously named Syniava, received the Magdeburg rights in 1543. In 1956, the town received the status of an urban-type settlement.

History
Until 18 July 2020, Stara Syniava was the administrative center of Stara Syniava Raion. The raion was abolished in July 2020 as part of the administrative reform of Ukraine, which reduced the number of raions of Khmelnytskyi Oblast to three. The area of Stara Syniava Raion was merged into Khmelnytskyi Raion.

Jewish Population
Stara Syniava had a large Jewish population for nearly 300 years, having been given the status of shtetl. In 1897, the town had 2279 Jews. During World War II, many Jewish residents were able to flee temporarily to Siberia and Uzbekistan, escaping extermination by the advancing German Army and Hitler's SS. Many who remained behind were rounded up by the invaders and killed evidenced by a mass grave of Jews found in Stara Sinyava. After the war some Jews returned to Stara Syniava and resumed living there. In the late 1970s Stara Syniava's Jewish population began emigrating from the USSR, largely to the U.S, Canada, and Israel. Today there are almost no Jews in the town.

References

Urban-type settlements in Khmelnytskyi Raion
Populated places established in 1543
1543 establishments in Europe
16th-century establishments in Ukraine
Podolia Voivodeship
Litinsky Uyezd